Carolina Chocolate Drops/Luminescent Orchestrii is a collaborative EP by Durham, North Carolina-based string band Carolina Chocolate Drops and experimental music band Luminescent Orchestrii. It was released on January 25, 2011 on Nonesuch Records.

Critical reception

Robert Christgau gave the EP an A grade and wrote that "All four songs are quick, sexy, and a trifle nasty." AllMusic's Steve Leggett gave the EP 3.5 out of 5 stars, and described it as "hardly some Frankenstein creation, but instead a fluid, energetic, and yes, even traditional-sounding set of gems that proves one can pull two different directions together into one without losing the strengths and passion of either."

Track listing
 "Short Dress Gal" (Sam Morgan, Barry Martyn, additional lyrics by Dom Flemons, Rhiannon Giddens, Adam Matta and Sxip Shirey) 3:22	
 "Escoutas (Diga Diga Diga)" (lyrics traditional, music by Sarah Alden, Sxip Shirey, and Luminescent Orchestrii)   4:39	
 "Hit ’Em Up Style" (Dallas Austin) 4:52	
 "Knockin’" (Rima Fand, Sxip Shirey)  5:27

References

The Carolina Chocolate Drops albums
2011 EPs
Collaborative albums